Anđelko Đuričić (Serbian Cyrillic: Анђелко Ђуричић; born 21 November 1980) is a Serbian retired professional footballer who played as a goalkeeper. He represented Serbia at the 2010 FIFA World Cup.

Club career
Đuričić started out at Dunav Stari Banovci, before moving to Dinamo Pančevo. He was transferred to Hajduk Kula in 2002, spending the following seven seasons at the club. In the summer of 2009, Đuričić moved abroad and signed with Portuguese club União Leiria. He was the team's first-choice goalkeeper in his debut season at the Estádio Dr. Magalhães Pessoa, missing only four league games. However, Đuričić lost his place on the team to Eduardo Gottardi in the following 2010–11 season, before eventually leaving the club.

International career
Đuričić made his international debut for Serbia in a 0–1 friendly loss against New Zealand on 29 May 2010, coming on as a substitute for Vladimir Stojković at half-time and managing to keep a clean sheet in the process. 

He was subsequently selected by Radomir Antić in the final 23-man squad for the 2010 FIFA World Cup, as the third-choice goalkeeper behind Stojković and Bojan Isailović.

References

External links
 
 
 
 
 

2010 FIFA World Cup players
Association football goalkeepers
Expatriate footballers in Malta
Expatriate footballers in Portugal
FK Borac Čačak players
FK Dinamo Pančevo players
FK Donji Srem players
FK Hajduk Kula players
FK Jagodina players
Mosta F.C. players
Sportspeople from Pančevo
Primeira Liga players
Serbian footballers
Serbia international footballers
Serbian expatriate footballers
Serbian expatriate sportspeople in Malta
Serbian expatriate sportspeople in Portugal
Serbian First League players
Serbian SuperLiga players
U.D. Leiria players
1980 births
Living people